Ptychobela salebra is a species of sea snail, a marine gastropod mollusk in the family Pseudomelatomidae, the turrids and allies.

Description

Distribution
This marine species occurs in the South China Sea.

References

 Li, B. & Li, X. (2007b). Two new species of conoidean gastropods (Gastropoda: Conoidea) from the northern South China Sea. The Veliger, 49, 79-83. NIZT 682
 Liu J.Y. [Ruiyu] (ed.). (2008). Checklist of marine biota of China seas. China Science Press. 1267 pp.

External links
 Zhang & Zhang, Types of marine gastropods deposited in the Marine Biological Museum, Chinese Academy of Sciences : Ptychobela salebra (holotype)

salebra
Gastropods described in 2007